Jalsa is a 2008 Indian Telugu-language action comedy film written and directed by Trivikram Srinivas and produced by Allu Aravind, under the Geetha Arts banner starring Pawan Kalyan, Ileana, Parvati Melton, Kamalinee Mukerji, Mukesh Rishi and Prakash Raj. The soundtrack of the film composed by Devi Sri Prasad, was launched on 29 February 2008. The film was released on 2 April 2008.

Plot
Sanjay Sahu aka Sanju is a post-graduate and works as a aerobics instructor. He is in love with Indu, who wishes to marry him. She makes him meet her father, who is a police officer and also happens to be his old acquaintance. Her father declines to approve of their love, and she is forced to marry according to her father's choice. Meanwhile, Indu's sister Bhagyamathi aka Bhagi and her friend Jyothsna aka Jo are chased by hoodlums before being rescued by Sanju. Furthermore, Jo and Bhagi are ragged in the college before being again rescued by Sanju. Both begin to like Sanju and even decide to propose their love to him without their knowledge of the other. However, it is Jo who proposes first to Sanju, who rejects her. Careful after seeing her friend's love rejected, Bhagi, with the help of Sreenu, begins wooing Sanju.

Bhagi keeps wooing Sanju in different ways under Sreenu's supervision. Sreenu keeps advising Bhagi with new ideas, so that she impresses Sanju. With his idea, Bhagi vacates the previous tenants in Sanjus' house and gets into that house to woo Sanju. She keeps trying in many ways to impress him, which evokes comedy. Bhagi keeps meeting Sanju, tries to know more about him. After many comical situations coming their way, love blossoms between them, but unfortunately at a party where Jo is also one of the attendees, she spills all the beans about Bhagi and Sanju is infuriated and ends their relationship. But later that party night in conversation with Bhagi, drunken Sanju begins to showcase that he isn't a correct fit to her, yet the unending love of Bhagi towards Sanju, makes him fall for her and both again get into a relationship marking it with a kiss.

Meanwhile, Damodar Reddy, a powerful land grabber who takes care of all the settlements while still in jail, is out on parole. He is in search of Sanju for spoiling his land deals in the past and thrashing his son, who was one of the goons who chased Bhagi. He makes an attempt on Sanju's life but in vain. However, Sanju's friend Abhi is taken hostage during the attack. Sanju rescues Abhi but is enraged when his friends stop him from assaulting the kidnapper by questioning his authority to take the law into his hands and bringing them troubles. Sanju then reveals his flashback, in which he hailed from a poor rural family. His brother dies of heart disease as a child. His father Janardhan Sahu kills himself as crops fail, and his mother too passes away. While going to the burial ground, he repeatedly slips and swoons at a stone pillar. He plucks it out, which enrages the henchmen of Damodar Reddy . When they attack him, Sanju beats them up, disappears into a forest, and joins the Naxalites. During a combing operation, he joins hands with the father of Indu and Bhagi - a police officer - and his team to eliminate the team in an encounter. Sanju is then rehabilitated as a college student in Hyderabad.

Bhagi confesses to her father about her intention to marry Sanju, but her father rejects it by revealing to her about Sanju being an ex-lover of her sister Indu, and an ex-naxal. Shocked, Bhagi agrees to get married as per her father's choice. Her father arranges the engagement of Bhagi with Raghu Ram. Sanju is disgusted that Bhagi has given her assent to the engagement and decides to break it. Meanwhile, Sanju learns that the man who attempted on his life is none other than Damodar Reddy and that Raghu Ram is the elder son of Damodar Reddy. Sanju confronts Damodar Reddy in jail and challenges him. Damodar Reddy leaves jail and forcibly arranges the marriage of Raghuram with Bhagi. Sanju, meanwhile, kidnaps the younger son of Damodar Reddy, takes Damodar Reddy head-on, and defeats him. The film ends with Bhagi marrying Sanju.

The movie ends with a paralyzed Damodar Reddy dying of heart attack on the same road that Sanju defeated him on.

Cast

 Pawan Kalyan as Sanjay "Sanju" Sahu
 Ileana as Bhagyamathi "Bhagi" (dubbed by Swathi Reddy)
 Parvati Melton as Jyothsna "Jyo"
 Kamalinee Mukerji as Indu, Bhagi's sister
 Mukesh Rishi as Damodar Reddy
 Prakash Raj as Indu and Bhagyamati's father
 Brahmanandam as Pranav, Head Constable
 Ali as Abhi
 Sunil as Seenu
 Tanikella Bharani as Bulli Reddy
 Sivaji as Raghu, Damodar Reddy's elder son
 Aditya Redij as Damodar Reddy's younger son
 Kamal Kamaraju as Indu's husband
 Makarand Deshpande as Naxalite
 Shishir Sharma as Janardhan Sahu
 Dharmavarapu Subramanyam as Doctor
 Mallikarjuna Rao as Minister
 Bianca Desai as Bhagyamathi's friend
 Ravi Varma as Naxalite
 Krishnudu
 Ravi Prakash as Sanju friend 
 Uttej as Sanju's friend
 Satyam Rajesh as College student
 Bharath Reddy
 Mahesh Babu as Sekhar (voiceover)

Soundtrack
The soundtrack of the film was launched on 29 February 2008. The audio rights were sold to Aditya Music for  9 million, the highest for a Telugu film of its released month. The music got very good reviews from websites and an excellent response from the public itself. The music has been topping the charts since its release. Devi Sri Prasad received the 2008 Santosham Best Music Director Award for his work on the film's music.

Release

Theatrical 
Jalsa was released on 2 April 2008 in theaters worldwide. The film was originally scheduled to be released on 27 March 2008, but because of delays in the digital intermediate (DI) process. Jalsa was later released with 400 prints in 800 theaters worldwide across 1000 screens.

Remastered re-release 
Jalsa was re-released in theaters worldwide on 1 September 2022, coinciding with Kalyan's birthday, with remastered picture and sound.Jalsa grossed over ₹3.25 crore in its 2022 re-release.

As per the source,the collections of the Jalsa special shows will be donated to charity

Awards and nominations

References

External links
 

2008 films
Films directed by Trivikram Srinivas
Geetha Arts films
Films scored by Devi Sri Prasad
2000s Telugu-language films
Indian action comedy films
Films shot in Hyderabad, India
Films about Naxalism
2008 action comedy films